Miles is a surname. Notable people with the surname include:

Television and film
Miles Brothers, American early cinema pioneers
A. D. Miles, actor who is best known as Marty Shonson in Dog Bites Man
Annie Miles, actress
Ben Miles, British actor best known for his role as Patrick Maitland on the television situation comedy Coupling
Bernard Miles, English character actor, writer and director
Charlie Creed-Miles, English actor
Elaine Miles, Cayuse/Nez Perce actress best known for her role as Marilyn Whirlwind in the television series Northern Exposure
Joanna Miles (born 1940), American actress
Kevin Miles, Australian actor
Michael Miles, TV presenter in Britain
Nick Miles, English actor well known for his part in ITV's Emmerdale as businessman Jimmy King
Peter Miles (American actor) (1938–2002), American actor
Peter Miles (English actor) (1928–2018), British actor
Sarah Miles, English theater and film actress
Stuart Miles, British comedian and television presenter
Sylvia Miles (1924–2019), American actress
Vera Miles, American actress

Sports

Aaron Miles, retired Major League Baseball player
Aaron Miles (basketball), retired professional basketball player and current college basketball assistant coach
Barron Miles, defensive back for the British Columbia Lions in the Canadian Football League
Brent Miles, president of the Tri-City Dust Devils
C. J. Miles, American professional basketball player
Darius Miles, American basketball player for the NBA's Portland Trail Blazers
Eddie Miles, American football player
Ellie Miles (born 1999), English rugby union player
Eustace Miles, British Real Tennis player and author
Gene Miles, Australian rugby league footballer
Graham Miles, retired English snooker player
Harold Miles, English cricketer
Isaiah Miles (born 1994), American basketball player in the Israeli Basketball Premier League
John Miles (footballer), English footballer
John Miles (racing driver), former Formula One driver from England
Jonathan Miles (cricketer), English cricketer
Joshua Miles (American football) (born 1996), American football player
Ken Miles, British sports car driver
Les Miles, current head coach of the LSU football team
Linda Miles, American World Wrestling Entertainment alumnus
Marshall Miles (1926–2013), American bridge player
Ostell Miles (born 1970), American football player
Robert Miles (cricketer) (1846–1930), English cricketer
Sally Miles, American college sports coach
Stanley Miles, English cyclist
Tim Miles, American current head coach of the Nebraska men's basketball team
Tony Miles (Canadian football), Canadian Football League wide receiver/punt returner for the Toronto Argonauts
Trent Miles, current head coach of the Georgia State football team

Literature

 Barry Miles, author who has written biographies of Paul McCartney, William Burroughs, Frank Zappa, and Allen Ginsberg as well as books about John Lennon and the Beatles
 Dorothy Miles, sign language poet and playwright who worked in the U.K. and U.S.
 George Henry Miles, dramatist and man of letters
 Jack Miles, author whose work has appeared in numerous national publications
 Josephine Miles, poet and literature critic
 Lawrence Miles, science-fiction author best known for his work on original Doctor Who novels
 Lawrence Delos Miles, the author of Value Engineering
 Rosalind Miles (author), English author
 Susan Miles, British poet

Music
 Buddy Miles (1947–2008), American drummer, member of Jimi Hendrix's Band of Gypsys
 Butch Miles (1944-2023), American drummer and musician
 C. Austin Miles (Charles Austin Miles, 18681946}, American writer of gospel songs
 Floyd Miles (1943–2018), American musician
 Jane Mary Miles, married name of Jane Mary Guest (c. 1762 – 1846), English composer and pianist
 John Miles (1949–2021), English vocalist, guitarist and keyboard player best known for his 1976 Top 3 hit Music
 Lizzie Miles, African American singer
 Luke "Long Gone" Miles (1925–1987), American Texas blues and electric blues singer and songwriter
 Lynn Miles, Ottawa-based singer-songwriter
 Paul Miles-Kingston, British singer who achieved fame as a boy soprano classical singer
 Philip Napier Miles, English composer, philanthropist and landowner
 Robert Miles (1969–2017), stage name of Swiss-born Italian DJ and musician Roberto Concina

Military

 Dixon S. Miles, career U.S. Army officer who served in the Mexican–American War and the Indian Wars;  mortally wounded in Civil War
 Francis George Miles, English recipient of the Victoria Cross
 Admiral Sir Geoffrey John Audley Miles, English naval commander in both World Wars, last Commander in Chief of pre-independence Royal Indian Navy
 Louis Wardlaw Miles, World War I Medal of Honor recipient
 Nelson A. Miles, American soldier who served in the American Civil War, Indian Wars, and the Spanish–American War
 Samuel Miles, revolutionary American and Philadelphia public servant
 Sherman Miles (1882–1966), son of Nelson A. Miles. U.S. Army officer during World War I and II; head of M.I.D. at the time of the attack on Pearl Harbor.

Business

Kevin Miles (CEO), chief executive officer of Zoës Kitchen
Michael A. Miles, special limited partner of Forstmann Little & Company

Politics
Alonzo L. Miles (1864–1917), American politician and lawyer
Hooper S. Miles (1895–1964), American politician and lawyer
Jack Miles (political activist), Australian left-wing activist 
John Miles (Australian politician), Australian politician and member of the Victorian Legislative Council for Templestowe Province
John E. Miles, politician from New Mexico who served as Governor
Peter Hubbard-Miles, British Conservative Party politician
Philip John Miles, English politician, landowner, financier, father of John William Miles, Sir William Miles, 1st Baronet and Philip William Skinner Miles and grandfather of Sir Philip Miles, 2nd Baronet, Philip Napier Miles and Frank Miles, great-grandfather of Admiral Sir Geoffrey John Audley Miles.
Sir Philip Miles, 2nd Baronet, English politician and landowner
Philip Miles (British Army officer) (1864-1948)
Robert E. Miles, a White supremacist leader from Michigan
Rufus Miles (1910–1996), American government administrator
Steen Miles (1946–2017), American politician
William Porcher Miles, Representative from South Carolina born in Charleston on July 4, 1822
Sir William Miles, 1st Baronet, English politician and landowner

Other
 Rev'd Canon Charles Oswald Miles (1850-1898), Anglican Clergyman and brother of Frank Miles
 David Miles, British economist
 David Miles (radio), British continuity announcer and newsreader on BBC Radio 4
 Desmond Miles, main protagonist in the Assassin's Creed franchise's modern storyline (2007–2012)
 Frank Miles, London artist who specialised in pastel portraits of society ladies
 Frederick George Miles, British aircraft designer and constructor
 Grosvenor Miles (1901-1978), Anglican bishop in Madagascar and Australia
 Manly Miles (1826–1898), American zoologist and agriculturalist
 Mike Miles (disambiguation), multiple people
 Tony Miles, English chess player
 Valerie Miles (artist), British artist
 Vicki Miles-LaGrange, U.S. District Judge in the Western district of Oklahoma

See also

 Miles (disambiguation)
 Miln
 Milne (disambiguation)
 Milnes (disambiguation)
 Myles (given name)
 Myles (surname)